Altanagh is a townland in County Tyrone, Northern Ireland. It is situated in the historic barony of Omagh East and the civil parish of Termonmaguirk and covers an area of 971 acres.

The name derives from the Irish: altan ach (Abounding in cliffs or glens).

The population of the townland declined during the 19th century:

The townland contains one Scheduled Historic Monument: a burial mound (grid ref:  H6266 6936), which contained pits and urn burials with cremated bone. Three cordoned urns were found with a calibrated date range of 1890-1450 BC.

See also
List of townlands of County Tyrone
List of archaeological sites in County Tyrone

References

Townlands of County Tyrone
Archaeological sites in County Tyrone
Civil parish of Termonmaguirk